Helen Williams Jackson (née Helen Williams, 1937–present) is an American model.

Career

Working as a stylist in a New York photographer's studio, Williams was discovered at age 17 by celebrity clients such as Lena Horne and Sammy Davis, Jr.

Her career began as an exclusive model for magazines such as Ebony and Jet. However, the discrimination she faced in the United States as an African-American led her to relocate to France in 1960, where she found success modeling for designers such as Christian Dior and Jean Dessès. She returned to the U.S. in 1961 and despite initial roadblocks went on to be the face of major ad campaigns by brands such as Budweiser and Sears. She was one of the first clients of Ophelia DeVore's Grace De Marco modeling agency.

Legacy 
Helen Williams Jackson has been credited with helping to break down racial barriers in modeling. In 2004, she was the recipient of the Trailblazer Award by the Fashion & Arts Xchange organization at a ceremony at New York's Fashion Institute of Technology.

Personal life 
Helen retired from modeling in 1970, but continued her career in fashion as a stylist. She married Norm Jackson in 1977, whom she had met during her modeling days. They now reside in Moorestown, New Jersey as of 2022.

References

Female models from New York (state)
African-American female models
African-American models
Living people
Year of birth missing (living people)
Place of birth missing (living people)
21st-century African-American people
21st-century African-American women